Boxing Day is a holiday celebrated after Christmas Day, occurring on the second day of Christmastide (26 December). Though it originated as a holiday to give gifts to poor people, today Boxing Day forms part of Christmas celebrations, with many people choosing to take advantage of Boxing Day sales. It originated in Great Britain and is celebrated in several countries that previously formed part of the British Empire. The attached bank holiday or public holiday may take place on 28 December if necessary to ensure it falls on a weekday. Boxing Day is also concurrent with the Christian festival Saint Stephen's Day.

In parts of Europe, such as several regions of Spain, the Czech Republic, Germany, Austria, Hungary, the Netherlands, Italy, Poland, Slovakia, Croatia, Denmark, Finland, Sweden, Belgium, Norway, and Ireland, 26 December is Saint Stephen's Day, which is considered the second day of Christmas.

Etymology 

There are competing theories for the origins of the term, none of which is definitive.

The European tradition of giving money and other gifts to those in need, or in service positions, has been dated to the Middle Ages, but the exact origin is unknown; it may reference the alms box placed in the narthex of Christian churches to collect donations for the poor. The tradition may come from a custom in the late Roman/early Christian era wherein alms boxes placed in churches were used to collect special offerings tied to the Feast of Saint Stephen, which, in the Western Christian Churches, falls on the same day as Boxing Day, the second day of Christmastide. On this day, it is customary in some localities for the alms boxes to be opened and distributed to the poor.

The Oxford English Dictionary gives the earliest attestation from Britain in 1743, defining it as "the day after Christmas day", and saying "traditionally on this day tradespeople, employees, etc., would receive presents or gratuities (a "Christmas box") from their customers or employers."

The term "Christmas box" dates back to the 17th century, and among other things meant:

A present or gratuity given at Christmas: in Great Britain, usually confined to gratuities given to those who are supposed to have a vague claim upon the donor for services rendered to him as one of the general public by whom they are employed and paid, or as a customer of their legal employer; the undefined theory being that as they have done offices for this person, for which he has not directly paid them, some direct acknowledgement is becoming at Christmas.

In Britain, it was a custom for tradesmen to collect "Christmas boxes" of money or presents on the first weekday after Christmas as thanks for good service throughout the year. This is mentioned in Samuel Pepys' diary entry for 19 December 1663. This custom is linked to an older British tradition where the servants of the wealthy were allowed the next day to visit their families since they would have had to serve their masters on Christmas Day. The employers would give each servant a box to take home containing gifts, bonuses, and sometimes leftover food. Until the late 20th century, there continued to be a tradition among many in the UK to give a Christmas gift, usually cash, to vendors, although not on Boxing Day, as many would not work on that day.

In South Africa, vendors who normally have little interaction with those they serve are accustomed to knocking on the customers' doors to ask for a "Christmas box", being a small cash donation, in the weeks before or after Christmas. This practice has become controversial, and some municipalities ban staff from asking for Christmas boxes.

Date 

Saint Stephen's Day, a religious holiday, also falls on 26th December.

Unlike the contemporary understanding of Boxing Day itself, the bank holiday or public holiday associated with the observance always falls on a weekday. Where 25 December falls on a Saturday and 26 December falls on a Sunday, the Christmas Day substitute holiday always takes place on Monday 27 December, while the Boxing Day substitute holiday always takes place on Tuesday 28 December. When Christmas Day is a Sunday, the Boxing Day holiday is still on the 26th, while Tuesday 27 December is the substitute holiday for Christmas Day.

Status by country  

In Australia, Boxing Day is a public holiday in all jurisdictions except the state of South Australia, where a public holiday known as Proclamation Day is celebrated on the first weekday after Christmas Day or the Christmas Day holiday. Both the Boxing Day Test cricket match held at the Melbourne Cricket Ground and The Sydney to Hobart Yacht Race begin on Boxing Day.

In Canada, Boxing Day is a federal statutory holiday. Government offices, banks, and postal services are closed. In Ontario, and other Canadian provinces, it is a provincial statutory holiday.

In Hong Kong, despite the transfer of sovereignty from the UK to China in 1997, Boxing Day is a general holiday as the first weekday after Christmas.

In Ireland, when the entire island was part of the United Kingdom, the Bank Holidays Act 1871 established the feast day of Saint Stephen as a non-moveable public holiday on 26 December. Following partition in 1920, Northern Ireland reverted to the British name, Boxing Day. In County Donegal, particularly in East Donegal and Inishowen, the day is also popularly known as Boxing Day.

In New Zealand, Boxing Day is a statutory holiday. On these holidays, people who must work receive  times their salaries, and a day in lieu is provided to employees who work.

In Nigeria, Boxing Day is a public holiday for working people and students. When it falls on a Saturday or Sunday, there is always a holiday on Monday.

In Scotland, Boxing Day has been specified as an additional bank holiday since 1974, by royal proclamation under the Banking and Financial Dealings Act 1971.

In Singapore, Boxing Day was a public holiday for working people and students; when it fell on a Saturday or Sunday, there was a holiday on Monday. However, Boxing Day is no longer a public holiday.

In South Africa, 26 December is the Day of Goodwill, a public holiday.

In Trinidad and Tobago, Boxing Day is a public holiday.

In the UK outside Scotland, 26 December (unless it is a Sunday) has been a bank holiday since 1871. When 26 December falls on a Saturday, the associated public holiday is on the following Monday. When 26 December falls on a Sunday, the public holiday is the following Tuesday, Monday being the public holiday associated with Christmas Day.  The same practice is observed in Canada.

In the British overseas territory of Bermuda, the costumed Gombey dancers perform throughout the mid-Atlantic island on Boxing Day, a tradition believed to date back to the 18th century when slaves were permitted to gather at Christmastime.

In Massachusetts, US, Governor William F. Weld declared in 1996 that every 26 December is Boxing Day, in response to the efforts of a coalition of British citizens to "transport the English tradition to the United States", but not an employee holiday.

Shopping 

In the United Kingdom, Canada, Australia, Trinidad and Tobago, and New Zealand, Boxing Day is primarily known as a shopping holiday. Boxing Day sales are common and shops often allow dramatic price reductions. For many merchants, Boxing Day has become the day of the year with the greatest revenue. In the UK, it was estimated in 2009 that up to 12 million shoppers appeared at the sales (a rise of almost 20% compared to 2008, although this was also affected by the fact that the VAT was about to revert to 17.5% from 1 January, following the temporary reduction to 15%).

Many retailers open very early (typically 5 am or even earlier) and offer doorbuster deals and loss leaders to draw people to their stores. It is not uncommon for long queues to form early in the morning of 26 December, hours before the opening of shops holding the big sales, especially at big-box consumer electronics retailers. Many stores have a limited quantity of big draw or deeply discounted items. Because of the shoulder-to-shoulder crowds, many choose to stay at home and avoid the hectic shopping experience. Local media often covers the event, mentioning how early the shoppers began queuing up and showing videos of shoppers queuing and later leaving with their purchased items. Many retailers have implemented practices aimed at managing large numbers of shoppers. They may limit entrances, restrict the number of patrons in a store at a time, provide tickets to people at the head of the queue to guarantee them a hot ticket item, or canvass queued-up shoppers to inform them of inventory limitations.

In some areas of Canada, particularly in Atlantic Canada and parts of Northern Ontario, most retailers are prohibited from opening on Boxing Day, either by provincial law or by municipal bylaw, or by informal agreement among major retailers, to provide a day of relaxation following Christmas Day. In these areas, sales otherwise scheduled for 26 December are moved to the 27th. The city council of Greater Sudbury, Ontario, which was the largest city in Canada to maintain this restriction as of the early 2010s, formally repealed its store hours bylaw on 9 December 2014.

While Boxing Day is 26 December, many retailers run the sales for several days before or after 26 December, often up to New Year's Eve, branding it as "Boxing Week". Notably, in the recession of late 2008, a record number of retailers held early promotions due to a weak economy. In 2009, many retailers with both online and High Street stores launched their online sales on Christmas Eve and their High Street sales on Boxing Day.

Comparisons to Black Friday 

In terms of seasonal or holiday shopping traditions, Boxing Day sales have been compared to the U.S. phenomenon of Black Friday sales  Black Friday being the Friday following the American Thanksgiving holiday in late November. In the late 2000s, when the Canadian and United States dollars were near parity, Canadian retailers began to hold Black Friday promotions to attract consumers who would otherwise travel across the border to visit United States stores. This may have been a contributory factor, since 2013, in a relative decline of traditional Canadian Boxing Day sales, when compared to sales on Black Friday.

The traditional Boxing Day sales in the United Kingdom were never as large an event as the Black Friday sales are in the United States. However, many British retailers began to see an opportunity to import the Black Friday tradition into the UK, not to replace Boxing Day sales, but as an addition to their overall seasonal promotions. However, Black Friday and Boxing Day are close enough together that spending on one sale was likely to affect spending on the other. Ultimately, the result was a marked decline in traditional Boxing Day sales in the UK. The change was initially facilitated, although not necessarily by design, by the fact that many retailers had American ownership, such as Amazon. This phenomenon was furthered by a general decline in traditional high-street shopping, and a growing online marketplace, which is more internationalist by nature. This led, in 2015, to November retail sales in the UK overtaking sales in December for the first time. In 2019, a retail analysis firm estimated that there was a 9.8% drop in British store traffic on Boxing Day in comparison to 2018 (the largest year-over-year drop since 2010), citing several factors, such as the weather, the increased prominence of online shopping, uncertainties in the wake of the general election, and the growing prominence of Black Friday sales.

Boxing Day sales are not a prominent tradition in the United States, although many retailers often begin after-Christmas sales that day. It is typically the earliest starting day after Christmas for people to return unwanted gifts for exchanges or refunds, and to redeem gift cards.

Sport 

In the United Kingdom, it is traditional for all top-tier football leagues in England, Scotland, and Northern Ireland – the Premier League, the Scottish Premiership, and the NIFL Premiership – and the lower ones, as well as the rugby leagues, to hold a full programme of football matches on Boxing Day. Originally, matches on Boxing Day were played against local rivals to avoid teams and their fans having to travel a long distance to an away game on the day after Christmas Day. Before the formation of leagues, several traditional rugby union fixtures took place on Boxing Day each year, notably Llanelli v London Welsh and Leicester v The Barbarians. The 2022 Premier League Boxing Day fixtures see the return to domestic top flight football for the 2022-23 Premier League season, following the six-week break due to the 2022 FIFA World Cup.

In Italy, Boxing Day football was played for the first time in the 2018/19 Serie A season. The experiment was successful, with Italian stadiums 69% full on average – more than any other match day in December 2018.

In rugby league, festive fixtures were a staple of the traditional winter season. Since the transition to a summer season in the 1990s, no formal fixtures are now arranged on Boxing Day but some clubs, such as Wakefield Trinity, arrange a traditional local derby friendly fixture instead.

In Australia, New Zealand, and South Africa, Test cricket matches are played on Boxing Day. For more details see Boxing Day Test.

In Australia, the first day of the Boxing Day Test in Melbourne and the start of the Sydney to Hobart Yacht Race is on Boxing Day.

In horse racing, there is the King George VI Chase at Kempton Park Racecourse in Surrey, England. It is the second most prestigious chase in Britain, after the Cheltenham Gold Cup. In addition to the prestigious race at Kempton, in Britain, it is usually the day with the highest number of racing meetings of the year, with eight in 2016, in addition to three more in Ireland. In Barbados, the final day of horse racing is held on Boxing Day at The Historic Garrison Savannah, a UNESCO world heritage site. This tradition has been going on for decades in this former British colony.

Boxing Day is one of the main days in the hunting calendar for hunts in the UK and US, with most hunts (both mounted foxhound or harrier packs and foot packs of beagles or bassets) holding meets, often in town or village centres.

Several ice hockey contests are associated with the day. The IIHF World Junior Championship typically begins on 26 December, while the Spengler Cup also begins on 23 December in Davos, Switzerland; the Spengler Cup competition includes HC Davos, Team Canada, and other top European Hockey teams. The National Hockey League traditionally had close to a full slate of games (10 were played in 2011), following the league-wide days off given for Christmas Eve and Christmas Day. However, the 2013 collective bargaining agreement (which followed a lock-out) extended the league mandate of Christmas Eve and Christmas Day off to include Boxing Day, except when it falls on a Saturday, in which case the league can choose to make 23 December a league-wide off day instead for that year.

In some African Commonwealth nations, particularly Ghana, Uganda, Malawi, Zambia, and Tanzania, professional boxing contests are held on Boxing Day. This practice has also been followed for decades in Guyana and Italy.

Games traditionally begin at 1:15 pm.

Boxing Day Tsunami  

The 2004 Indian Ocean earthquake and tsunami occurred the day after Christmas,  and therefore has been referred to as  "the Boxing Day Tsunami".

See also

References

External links

 The Origins of Boxing Day at Snopes

 
Christmastide
Christmas events and celebrations
December observances
Public holidays in Australia
Public holidays in Canada
Public holidays in New Zealand
Public holidays in the United Kingdom
Public holidays in Denmark
Public holidays in Sweden
Public holidays in Norway
Public holidays in Iceland
Public holidays in the Netherlands